Octopus wolfi, the star-sucker pygmy octopus, is the smallest known octopus. It is found in fairly shallow waters in the western Pacific. It is characterised by a pattern of "papillate fringes" around the edge of the suckers near the arm tip.

References

Octopuses
Molluscs described in 1913